Nadia Cavalera (born 20 September 1950 in Galatone, Lecce) is an Italian novelist, poet and literary critic.

Cavalera attended the Liceo Classico "Palmieri" de Lecce and earned a bachelor's degree in Philosophy in the Università di Lecce, with the thesis "Democrazia e socialismo nel giovane Marx". She started her political activity in PCI when she was 20 years old. She worked in Brindisi for 12 years and since 1988, she has lived and worked as a teacher in Modena. She founded Brindisi's first entirely literary magazine, Gheminga.  In 1990, she and the poet Edoardo Sanguineti founded and became editors of the journal Bollettario: quadrimestrale di scrittura e critica, issued three times a year, which is a publication of literature and literary criticism of the cultural association "Le avanguardie". The association proposes an avant-garde philosophy that can be permanent, non-elitist and open to the concept of umafeminità (a mix of uomo, man and feminità, femininity, a concept which sees men and women as equal despite their differences). In 2005, she founded the literary prize Premio Alessandro Tassoni, which is administered by the University of Modena and Reggio Emilia.

Publications

Prose
I palazzi di Brindisi – Schena, Fasano, 1986
Nottilabio - Roma, La città della luna,  1995

Poetry
Vita Novissima, Modena, Bollettariolibri, 1992
Americanata, Modena, Bollettariolibri, 1993
Ecce Femina, Napoli, Altri termini, 1994
Brogliasso, Modena, Gheminga, 1996
Salentudine, Venezia, Marsilio, 2004
Superrealisticallegoricamente, Roma, Fermenti, 2005; Premio L'Aquila - Carispaq.

Wordvisual works
Imprespressioni, 1970
Adriana, 1972
Golphe de Genes, 1975
Sospensioni, 1980
Amsirutuf: enimma, 1988
I prestanomi: uomini senza, 1993
La città della luna, 1997

Catalogues
Superrealismo allegorico, Modena, 1993
Superrealismo allegorico, Modena,1995
Superrealismo allegorico, Modena,1997
Superrealismo allegorico, Modena,1999

Books about artists
Il capo: lavoro, romanzo senza parole, 1991
Stundaia, 1995

References

External links
Associazione Culturale "Le Avanguardie"
Bollettario, quadrimestrale di scrittura e critica
Premio "Alessandro Tassoni"
RomArt - Movimenti artistici: Superrealismo allegorico
Nadia Cavalera in:Journal of Italian Translation

1950 births
Living people
20th-century Italian novelists
Italian women novelists
Italian poets
Italian women poets
Italian literary critics
Italian women literary critics
20th-century Italian women writers